Naxibacter haematophilus is a Gram-negative, rod-shaped, oxidase-positive, and non-spore-forming bacterium which was isolated from clinical specimens and water samples.

Etymology
Its specific name  comes from the Greek haem (-atosa), which means "blood", and the Greek philos, which means "loving", because the strain was isolated from blood.

References

Burkholderiales
Bacteria described in 2008